Khaled Al Zaher (born 2 September 1972) is a Syrian former footballer.

Club career
Al Zaher played for most of his career in Greece, including three seasons with Proodeftiki in the Greek Super League. He made over 100 league appearances for Proodeftiki before joining Halkidona. He was released by Halkidona at age 33 in 2005.

International career
From 1997 to 2005, Al Zaher made several appearances for the senior Syria national football team, including 11 qualifying matches for the FIFA World Cup.

He also played for Syria at the 1995 FIFA World Youth Championship in Qatar.

References

External links
 
 

1972 births
Living people
Syrian footballers
Syrian expatriate footballers
Hurriya SC players
Proodeftiki F.C. players
Chalkidona F.C. players
Thrasyvoulos F.C. players
Al-Ittihad Aleppo players
Expatriate footballers in Greece
Expatriate footballers in Lebanon
Syrian expatriate sportspeople in Greece
Syrian expatriate sportspeople in Lebanon
1996 AFC Asian Cup players
Lebanese Premier League players
Tadamon Sour SC players
Association football midfielders
Syrian Premier League players
Syria international footballers